The double-striped bluet (Enallagma basidens) is a species of damselfly in the family Coenagrionidae. This species grows to lengths 21–28 mm. Its common name from the peculiar black shoulder stripe, which is divided in two by a thin blue stripe. This is the key identification characteristic; no other damselfly has a shoulder stripe that looks like this one.

Mature males have an abdomen that alternates black and blue. The final segment of the abdomen is blue below and black above, while segments 8 and 9 are all blue. Females and immatures are tan to olive or brown, but like the mature males they have the divided shoulder stripe.

These damselflies are most typically found alongside lakes and ponds, but are occasionally found next to slow-moving streams, too.

Distribution
Mexico: Tamaulipas, San Luis Potosí, Nuevo León, Coahuila, Chihuahua, Baja California
United States: (Alabama • Arkansas • Arizona • California • Colorado • Delaware • Florida • Georgia • Iowa • Illinois • Indiana • Kansas • Kentucky • Louisiana • Maryland • Michigan • Missouri • Mississippi • Nebraska • North Carolina • New Jersey • New Mexico • Ohio • Pennsylvania • South Carolina • Tennessee • Texas • Vermont • Wisconsin • West Virginia)
Canada: (Ontario)

References

Enallagma basidens, Double-Striped Bluet, Family Coenagrionidae
Enallagma basidens(Double-Striped Bluet Damselfly)
 Lam, E. (2004) Damselflies of the Northeast. Forest Hills, NY:Biodiversity Books. p. 71.
 

Coenagrionidae
Odonata of North America
Insects of Canada
Insects of Mexico
Insects of the United States
Fauna of the Eastern United States
Insects described in 1902
Taxa named by Philip Powell Calvert